Castelnuovo del Garda is an Italian comune (municipality), in the Province of Verona, in Veneto, on a couple of morainic hills few kilometers south-east from Lake Garda. Verona is about 20 km to the east, Venice is 140 km east and Milan 140 km west.

Castelnuovo del Garda has a short beach on the lake, between the municipalities of Peschiera del Garda and Lazise. The comune borders the following municipalities: Bussolengo, Lazise, Peschiera del Garda, Sona, and Valeggio sul Mincio.

Gardaland, the biggest amusement park in Italy, is expanding mainly within the Castelnuovo municipality, close to Lake Garda shores.

History 
From few archaeological rests found on the top of the main hill (called monte Alto), probably Castelnuovo del Garda was already inhabited during the prehistorical age.

During the Roman period, it was first known as Beneventum, and after renamed Quadrivium which literally means 4 roads, or crossroad. Indeed, its location was strategical being at the crossroad between the Via Gallica (which was connecting the modern Torino with the modern Venezia passing by Milan, the actual SS11), and a connection with the Via Claudia Augusta (which was connecting central Italy with Austria passing by the Val d'Adige and the Alps).

In the 12th century, Quadrivium has been destroyed by Frederick Barbarossa. Consequentially rebuilt as a fortify town, Quadrivium was renamed Castrum Novum (which means New Castle), and the name has remained unchanged with the Italian version Castelnuovo.

During the centuries, Castelnuovo passed under different political controls, from the Lord of Verona (Signoria degli Scaligeri), the Lord of Milano (Signoria dei Visconti), the Venetian Republic, the Austrian empire (see the next chapter for the "Castelnuovo massacre"), and eventually becoming part of the Regno d'Italia with the third Italian independence war and the consequential Armistice of Cormons, in the 1866.

Only in 1970, Castelnuovo took its actual name Castelnuovo del Garda, to highlight its location close to the lake Garda shores.

The Castelnuovo Massacre – 11 April 1848 
On 11 April 1848 Castelnuovo del Garda was almost totally destroyed and burned by the Austrian empire army (including the church and the medieval tower), during the first Italian independence war. That day, 400 men of the  fought against 3000 Austrian soldiers, which consequentially burned the city killing around 89 local citizens (46 of them women and children) as reprisal for the revolutionary actions that were taking place in the region.

The Austrian army was headed by the field marshal Joseph Radetzky, who was serving in Verona, and the commander Whillerm Thurn. The Italian Volontari had been sent by the major Luciano Manara and commanded by Agostino Noaro.

Main Historical Sites 
 The tower of Castelnuovo, built by the Lord of Milano – 14th century
 Church of the Madonna degli Angeli – 15th century
 Church of S.Maria Nascente – 18th century
 Villa Cossali Sella – 15th century
 Villa Arvedi D'Emilei – 17th century
 Villa Negri – 17th century

Culture

Events 
 Festa dell'uva (wine festival), the most important event in Castelnuovo del Garda is the wive festival that takes place every year at the end of the summer, usually a weekend in the mid-September. It is a celebration of the historically most important economic sector of the region: the wine production. During the festival, several local producers present their wine and participate to a competition for the best wine of the year. In addition, several cultural and historical exhibition are taking place during the whole weekend.
 Festa della Bandiera (the flag celebration). The third Sunday of June the municipality celebrates an event occurred 24 June 1866, during the third Italian independence war. In the specific, in the municipality district Oliosi, a group of soldiers remained surrounded by the enemy and decided to divide the flag between each other in order to avoid to give to the enemy.

Media

Twin towns 
 Neustadt an der Aisch, Germany, since 1988
 Trebnje, Slovenia, since 2001

References

External links 
 Official website

Cities and towns in Veneto
Populated places on Lake Garda